George Handley may refer to:

 George Handley (politician) (1752–1793), American politician, Governor of Georgia, 1788–1789
 George Handley (footballer, born 1868) (1868–1938), English footballer
 George Handley (footballer, born 1886) (1886–1952), English footballer
 George Handley (footballer, born 1912) (1912–1943), English footballer
 George B. Handley, professor of humanities at Brigham Young University

See also
 George Handley Knibbs (1858–1929), Australian scientist